Fairfield is a city in and the county seat of Wayne County, Illinois, United States, and the location of Frontier Community College. The population was 4,883 at the 2020 census.

History

Fairfield is most famous for being the hometown of the "friendly" people, and for the Shelton Brothers Gang, notorious bootleggers who fought it out with the Harrisburg, Illinois-based Birger Gang to control criminal activities in Southern Illinois. During the first half of the 20th century, gang leaders Carl, Earl and Bernie Shelton made Fairfield a household name. Based on testimony of Charlie Birger himself, the Shelton Brothers were convicted for a 1925 unsolved mail carrier robbery of $15,000 and were sentenced to 25 years. They were released a few years later. Birger dominated bootlegging in Southern Illinois until he himself was hanged in Benton for the murder of West City Mayor Joe Adams in 1928. After serving their time, the Shelton brothers built a new criminal empire. Based out of East St Louis, one of the most prosperous cities of its day, they controlled all vice from Peoria and southward.

They met their demise at the hands of the Chicago mob and an insider Charles "Blackie" Harris. A land dispute led to Blackie joining forces with the Mob to kill off members of the Shelton gang. His most notable victim was Carl Shelton, the leader. He was ambushed several miles southeast of Fairfield, shot from his Jeep. Bernie was killed at his Peoria roadhouse. Earl moved to Jacksonville, Florida and became a successful land speculator.

Geography 

Climate

Demographics 

As of the census of 2000, there were 5,421 people, 2,495 households, and 1,494 families residing in the city. The racial makeup of the city was 98.40% White, 0.09% African American, 0.26% Native American, 0.63% Asian, 0.02% Pacific Islander, 0.06% from other races, and 0.55% from two or more races. Hispanic or Latino of any race were 0.42% of the population.

There were 2,495 households, out of which 24.8% had children under the age of 18 living with them, 46.4% were married couples living together, 10.8% had a female householder with no husband present, and 40.1% were non-families. 37.0% of all households were made up of individuals, and 21.3% had someone living alone who was 65 years of age or older.  The average household size was 2.11 and the average family size was 2.74.

In the city, the population was spread out, with 20.5% under the age of 18, 8.0% from 18 to 24, 24.1% from 25 to 44, 22.4% from 45 to 64, and 24.9% who were 65 years of age or older.  The median age was 43 years. For every 100 females, there were 82.1 males.  For every 100 females age 18 and over, there were 77.6 males.

The median income for a household in the city was $25,797, and the median income for a family was $36,278. Males had a median income of $28,866 versus $19,985 for females. The per capita income for the city was $16,791.  About 8.5% of families and 13.1% of the population were below the poverty line, including 16.7% of those under age 18 and 9.6% of those age 65 or over.

Education
 Center Street School
 North Side School
 Fairfield Community High School
 Frontier Community College

Notable people
 Ben C. Blades, Illinois state legislator 
 Carroll C. Boggs, Illinois Supreme Court justice
 William Borah, Senator known as the "Lion of Idaho"
 H. S. Burgess, Illinois state legislator and lawyer; served as mayor of Fairfield 
 Charles W. Creighton, Illinois state representative and lawyer.
 Thomas H. Creighton, Illinois state representative and lawyer 
 Kenneth Michael Kays, recipient of the Medal of Honor for heroism during the Vietnam War
 Drue Pearce, Alaska state legislator 
 Clyde W. Robbins, farmer and Illinois state representative

References

External links 
City of Fairfield official website
Fairfield Current
Greater Fairfield Area Chamber of Commerce
Fairfield-Wayne Co. Area Development Commission
WFIW Radio
Fairfield Community High School

Cities in Illinois
Cities in Wayne County, Illinois
County seats in Illinois